= Short & Main =

Restaurant in Gloucester, Massachusetts, U.S.

- Interactive map of Short & Main

Restaurant information
- Location: Gloucester, Massachusetts, United States
- Coordinates: 42.61200°N 70.66559°W

Short & Main is a restaurant in Gloucester, Massachusetts. It was included in The New York Times's 2024 list of the 22 best pizzerias in the U.S.
